Stanisław Szwed (born 12 April 1955 in Bielsko-Biała) is a Polish politician. He was elected to the Sejm on 13 October 2019, getting 65,315 votes in 27 Bielsko-Biała district as a candidate from the Law and Justice list.

He was also a member of Sejm 1997-2001.

See also
Members of Polish Sejm 2005-2007

External links
Stanisław Szwed - parliamentary page - includes declarations of interest, voting record, and transcripts of speeches.

1955 births
Living people
People from Bielsko-Biała
Law and Justice politicians
Members of the Polish Sejm 1997–2001
Members of the Polish Sejm 2005–2007
Members of the Polish Sejm 2007–2011
Members of the Polish Sejm 2011–2015
Members of the Polish Sejm 2015–2019
Members of the Polish Sejm 2019–2023